Luis Suárez is a Uruguayan professional footballer who represents the Uruguay national team as a striker. He made his debut for his country in a 3–1 friendly victory over Colombia in Cúcuta on 7 February 2007. Since then, he has recorded 68 international goals in 137 appearances, making him the nation's all-time top scorer.

Suárez's first goal came in his third appearance for Uruguay, scoring the opener in a 5–0 2010 FIFA World Cup qualification win against Bolivia in October 2007. He became his country's top scorer at the age of 26, when he scored twice against Tahiti in a 2013 FIFA Confederations Cup group match in June 2013. Suárez scored eleven goals during Uruguay's qualification campaign for the 2014 FIFA World Cup, making him joint top scorer with Robin van Persie during qualification. Following an incident in which he was adjudged to have bitten Italy's Giorgio Chiellini during the finals, Suárez was banned for nine international games and did not feature for Uruguay in 2015. His goal in the 1–0 victory over Saudi Arabia in the group stage of the 2018 FIFA World Cup made Suárez the only Uruguayan to score in three World Cup final tournaments (a feat matched later on by teammate Edinson Cavani).

, Suárez has scored three or more goals (a hat-trick) on two occasions. He scored three times against Indonesia in a 7–1 friendly win in October 2010, and all four goals in a 4–0 victory in a 2014 World Cup qualification game against Chile in November 2011. Suarez has scored 29 goals in FIFA World Cup qualifiers, making him the all-time top scorer of qualification in CONMEBOL. Suárez has scored seven times in World Cup finals, seven times in the Copa América and three times in the FIFA Confederations Cup.

Suárez has scored more times (eight) against Chile than any other opponent. 21 of his goals have been scored at the Estadio Centenario, with the remainder coming at overseas venues. His most recent goal came on 29 March 2022, when he scored the opening goal of Uruguay's 2–0 World Cup qualifying win against Chile.

International goals

Uruguay score listed first, score column indicates score after each Suárez goal.

Note: In a World Cup qualifier on 10 June 2012 where Uruguay defeated Peru 4–2, FIFA's match summary lists Suárez as the scorer of the opening goal. FIFA has also published reports where they credit the goal to Sebastián Coates. Other notable sources also credit the goal to Coates. Suárez himself also insisted that Coates scored the goal, therefore it is not listed in his tally above.

Statistics

References

Suarez, Luis
Suarez, Luis